The Greater Toronto Area, commonly referred to as the GTA, includes the City of Toronto and the regional municipalities of Durham, Halton, Peel, and York. In total, the region contains 25 urban, suburban, and rural municipalities. The Greater Toronto Area begins in Burlington in Halton Region, and extends along Lake Ontario past downtown Toronto eastward to Clarington in Durham Region.

According to the 2021 census, the Census Metropolitan Area (CMA) of Toronto has a total population of 6,202,225. However, the Greater Toronto Area, which is an economic area defined by the Government of Ontario, includes communities which are not included in the CMA as defined by Statistics Canada. Extrapolating the data for all 25 communities in the Greater Toronto Area from the 2021 Census, the total population for the economic region included 6,711,985 people.

The Greater Toronto Area is a part of several larger areas in Southern Ontario. The area is also combined with the city of Hamilton to form a conurbation known as the Greater Toronto and Hamilton Area (GTHA). The GTHA combined with Niagara Region form the core of the Golden Horseshoe.

Etymology
The term "Greater Toronto" was first used in writing as early as the 1900s, although at the time, the term only referred to the old city of Toronto and its immediate townships and villages, which became Metropolitan Toronto in 1954 and became the current city of Toronto in 1998. The use of the term involving the four surrounding regional municipalities came into formal use in the mid-1980s, after it was used in a widely discussed report on municipal governance restructuring in the region and was later made official as a provincial planning area. However, it did not come into everyday usage until the mid- to late 1990s.

In 2006, the term began to be supplanted in the field of spatial planning as provincial policy increasingly began to refer to either the "Greater Toronto and Hamilton Area" (GTHA) or the still-broader "Greater Golden Horseshoe". The latter includes the Greater Toronto Area's satellite municipalities, such as Peterborough, Barrie, Guelph, Kitchener, Waterloo, Cambridge and Niagara Region. The GTA continues, however, to be in official use elsewhere in the Government of Ontario, such as the Ministry of Finance.

Census metropolitan area

Some municipalities considered part of the GTA are not within the Toronto Census Metropolitan Area (CMA) which is smaller than the land area and population of the GTA planning area. For example, Oshawa is the centre of its own CMA, yet deemed part of the Greater Toronto Area, while other municipalities, such as New Tecumseth in southern Simcoe County and Mono Township in Dufferin County are included in the Toronto CMA but not in the GTA. These different border configurations result in the GTA's population being higher than the Toronto CMA by nearly one-half million people, often leading to confusion amongst people when trying to sort out Toronto's urban population.

Other nearby urban areas, such as Hamilton, Barrie, St. Catharines-Niagara or Kitchener-Waterloo, are not part of the GTA or the Toronto CMA, but form their own CMAs near the GTA. Ultimately, all the aforementioned places are part of the Greater Golden Horseshoe metropolitan region, an urban agglomeration, which is the sixth most populous in North America. It is part of the Great Lakes megalopolis, containing an estimated 59 million people in 2011.

Extended area
The term "Greater Toronto and Hamilton Area" (GTHA) refers to the GTA, and the city of Hamilton, located along the western border of the Greater Toronto Area. The term has been adopted by several organizations, including Metrolinx and the Ministry of Energy) due to growing commuter population in the combined region. The GTHA and the Regional Municipality of Niagara form the inner ring of the larger Greater Golden Horseshoe, an urban agglomeration and secondary region of Ontario.

History

Early history
Historically the Greater Toronto Area was home to a number of First Nations  who lived on the shore of Lake Ontario long before the first Europeans arrived in the region. At various times the Neutral, the Seneca, the Mohawk and the Huron nations were living in the vicinity. The Mississaugas arrived in the late 17th or early 18th century, driving out the occupying Iroquois. While it is unclear as to who was the first European to reach the Toronto area, there is no question it occurred in the 17th century.

The area would later become very crucial for its series of trails and water routes that led from northern and western Canada to the Gulf of Mexico. Known as the "Toronto Passage", it followed the Humber River, as an important overland shortcut between Lake Ontario, Lake Simcoe and the upper Great Lakes. For this reason the area, under French fur traders, became a major part of the North American fur trade. The French would later establish three trading forts, Magasin Royal in the 1720s, although abandoned within the decade, Fort Toronto in 1750 and Fort Rouillé in 1751. During the Seven Years' War both forts were abandoned but Fort Toronto was later renovated. Fort Rouillé was burnt down after the Battle of Fort Niagara in 1759 by the French garrison during the French and Indian War.

The first large influx of European settlers to settle the region were the United Empire Loyalists arriving after the American Revolution, when various individuals petitioned the Crown for land in and around the Toronto area. In 1787, the British negotiated the purchase of more than a quarter million acres of land in the area of Toronto with the Mississaugas of New Credit. York County, would later be created by Governor John Graves Simcoe in 1792, which would at its largest size, comprise all of what is now Halton Region, Toronto, Peel Region, York Region and parts of Durham Region.

The GTA saw three American incursions during the War of 1812. The Town of York (present-day Toronto) was attacked by American forces at Battle of York, on April 27, 1813; and was subsequently occupied until May 8. The second incursion occurred several months later, in July 1813, with two landings in the GTA. On July 29, American forces landed at Burlington Beach (present-day Burlington) in an attempt to dislodge British forces at the adjacent Burlington Heights. However, finding the British forces too well-entrenched for any assault to be successful, the American naval force withdrew and proceeded east towards York. The American landings at York on July 31 went unopposed, with most of the soldiers garrisoned at York directed to defend Burlington Heights. The third incursion occurred a year later, when an American naval squadron arrived outside of York's harbour on August 6, 1814. The squadron dispatched  to enter the harbour in order to gauge the town's defences, where it briefly exchanged cannon fire with Fort York before withdrawing to rejoin the American squadron outside the harbour. American forces did not attempt a landing during this incursion, although remained outside York's harbour for three days before departing.

In 1816, Wentworth County (which would later become the city of Hamilton) and Halton County were created from York County. York County would later serve as the setting for the beginnings of the Upper Canada Rebellion with William Lyon Mackenzie's armed march from Holland Landing towards York Township on Yonge Street, eventually leading up to the battle at Montgomery's Tavern. In 1851, Ontario County (present-day Durham Region) and Peel County were separated from York.

Since 1901

The idea towards a streamlined local government to control local infrastructure was made as early as 1907 by, William Findlay Maclean, a member of parliament and founder of The Toronto World, who called for the expansion of the government of the former City of Toronto in order to create a Greater Toronto. The idea for a single government municipality would not be seriously explored until the late 1940s when planners decided the city needed to incorporate its immediate suburbs. However, due to strong opposition from suburban politicians, a compromise was struck, which resulted in the creation of Metropolitan Toronto. In 1953, the portion of York County south of Steeles Avenue, a concession road which formed a common boundary between several townships across the width of the county, was severed from it and incorporated as the Municipality of Metropolitan Toronto. With the concession of Metro Toronto, the offices of York County were moved from Toronto to Newmarket.

Originally, the membership in Metropolitan Toronto included the City of Toronto and five townships: East York, Etobicoke, North York, Scarborough and York; as well as seven villages and towns, which became amalgamated into their surrounding townships in 1967. The early Metro Toronto government debated over the annexation of surrounding townships of Markham, Pickering and Vaughan. Frederick Goldwin Gardiner, the first Metro Toronto Chairman, planned on the conversion of these townships into boroughs of the Metro Toronto government. In 1971, the remaining areas of York County was replaced by the Ontario government with the Regional Municipality of York. In 1974, Ontario and Durham Counties were reorganized to become the Regional Municipality of Durham; Pickering west of Rouge River was transferred to Scarborough at that time. Peel County became Peel Region in 1974 as well. In 1980, North York would be incorporated into a city, with York following suit in 1983 and Etobicoke and Scarborough in 1984, although still part of the Metropolitan Toronto municipal government.

In 1992, the Ontario government passed legislation requiring Metropolitan Toronto to include the rest of the Greater Toronto Area into its planning. Despite this however, there was fear different parts of the municipal system were working against one another. Because of this, Bob Rae, then the Premier of Ontario, appointed Anne Golden to head a GTA task force to govern the region's quality of life, competitiveness and governance. During this time, the Metro Toronto government advocated to the task force the creation of a new GTA authority, which would be made up of 21 of the 30 existing municipalities in the GTA at the time. The proposal from Metro Toronto would have resulted in 15 new municipalities. The City of Mississauga argued consolidation should only take place in such a way the new municipalities would have a population between 400,000 and 800,000. The Town of Markham had similarly advocated municipal consolidation in York Region, although it was opposed to complete consolidation into a single municipality. Municipal consolidation faced stiff opposition however from smaller communities such as Ajax, Milton, and the borough of East York. The task force's recommendation to eliminate the Metro Toronto government, and consolidate its remaining municipalities into an enlarged City of Toronto was completed in 1997 and became official in 1998, under the Common Sense Revolution of the then premier, Mike Harris. However, the task force's recommendation to create a GTA-tier municipality was not taken up by the Harris government, fearing a GTA-wide municipality would recreate the inter-municipal competitiveness that was believed to have impaired the former Metro Toronto government.

Metrolinx, an agency of the Government of Ontario, was established to oversee public transit development across the Greater Toronto Area.

The Greater Toronto Area hosted the 2015 Pan American Games.

Geography

The region itself is bordered by Lake Ontario to the south, Kawartha Lakes to the east, the Niagara Escarpment to the west, and Lake Simcoe to the north. The region creates a natural ecosystem known as the Greater Toronto Bioregion. The Greater Toronto Area forms part of the neck of the Ontario Peninsula.

Vast parts of the region remain farmland and forests, making it one of the distinctive features of the geography of the GTA. Most of the urban areas in the GTA hold large urban forest. For the most part designated as parkland, the ravines are largely undeveloped. Rouge Park is also one of the largest nature parks within the core of a metropolitan area. Much of these areas also constitute the Toronto ravine system, which consists of deep and steep valleys, and a number of conservation areas in the region which are managed by Toronto and Region Conservation Authority. The Cheltenham Badlands in Caledon is an example of environmental degradation due to poor agricultural practice. The Scarborough Bluffs are part of the Glacial Lake Iroquois shoreline.

In 2005, the Government of Ontario also passed legislation to prevent urban development and sprawl on environmentally sensitive land in the Greater Toronto Area, known as the Greenbelt, many of these areas including protected sections of the Oak Ridges Moraine, Rouge Park and the Niagara Escarpment. Nevertheless, low-density suburban developments continue to be built, some on or near ecologically sensitive and protected areas. The provincial government attempted to address this issue through the "Places to Grow" legislation passed in 2005, which emphasizes higher-density growth in existing urban centres over the next 25 years (i.e., until 2030).

Climate

The climate of the Greater Toronto Area is classified as humid continental, according to the Köppen climate classification. Much of the Greater Toronto Area is under Köppen Dfb (warm summer subtype) zone, while Old Toronto (excluding the Toronto Islands) and some areas between there and Burlington to the southwest, are under the Köppen Dfa climate zone, the hot summer subtype. Precipitation averages  annually, fairly distributed through the year but driest in later winter with higher average totals in the later summer. Cold arctic outbreaks keep daytime highs below  for several days but this does not occur in every winter, while low temperatures sometimes drop below , accompanying wind chill makes this feel much colder. Mild and snow-free spells are also a feature of Toronto's winter, with temperatures surpassing  for several days, to occasionally above . Spring is short and often cool to mild, snow can sometimes fall well into April, rarely accumulating. The transition from spring into summer can be rapid. Although fairly sunny, summers do feature occasional heavy, thundery showers. Immediate lakeshore locations have generally lower average maximum temperatures but they can also experience hot conditions when offshore winds prevail. Normally in autumn it alternates between wet and dry with lengthy periods of mild and calm weather. Temperatures fall and windspeeds increase sharply in November and by December, cold and snowy weather are more common as the temperature average falls below .

Climate data

Economy

The Greater Toronto Area is a commercial, distribution, financial and economic centre, being the second largest financial centre in North America. The region generates about a fifth of Canada's GDP and is home to 40% of Canada's business headquarters. The economies of the municipalities in Greater Toronto are largely intertwined. The work force is made up of approximately 2.9 million people and more than 100,000 companies The Greater Toronto Area produces nearly 20% of the entire nation's GDP with $323 billion, and from 1992 to 2002, experienced an average GDP growth rate of 4.0% and a job creation rate of 2.4% (compared to the national average GDP growth rate of 3% and job creation rate of 1.6%). Greater Toronto has the largest regional economy in Canada, with its GDP surpassing the province of Quebec in 2015.

In 2010, over 51% of the labour force in the Greater Toronto Area is employed in the service sector, with 19% in the manufacturing, 17% of the labour force employed in wholesale & retail trade, 8% of the labour force involved in transportation, communication and utilities, and 5% of the workforce is involved in construction. Despite the fact the service industry makes up only 51% of Greater Toronto's workforce, over 72% of the region's GDP is generated by service industries.

The largest industry in the Greater Toronto Area is the financial services in the province, accounting for an estimated 25% of the region's GDP. Notably, the five largest banks in Canada all have their operational headquarters in Toronto's Financial District. Toronto is also home to the headquarters of the Toronto Stock Exchange and the Standard and Poor TSX Composite Index and offices of the TSX Venture Exchange. The TMX Group, the owners and operators of TSX Exchanges as well as the Montreal Exchange, are also headquartered in Toronto. The TSX and the TSX Venture Exchange represent 3,369 companies, including more than half of the world's publicly traded mining companies.

Markham also attracted the highest concentration of high tech companies in Canada, and because of it, has positioned itself as Canada's High-Tech Capital. The Greater Toronto Area is the second largest automotive centre in North America (after Detroit). Currently, General Motors, Ford and Chrysler run six assembly plants in the area, with Honda and Toyota having assembly plants just outside the GTA. General Motors, Ford, Honda, KIA, Mazda, Suzuki, Nissan, Volkswagen, Toyota, Hyundai, Aston Martin, Jaguar, Land Rover, Subaru, Volvo, BMW, and Mitsubishi have chosen the Greater Toronto Area for their Canadian headquarters. Magna International, the world's most diversified car supplier, also has its headquarters in Aurora. The automobile industry within the region accounts for roughly 10% of the region's GDP.

As with the rest of Canada, the economy of the Greater Toronto Area has been hit very hard by the COVID-19 pandemic in the early 2020s.

Agriculture

While it was once the most dominant industry for residents in the Greater Toronto Area, agriculture now occupies a small percentage of the population, but still a large part of land in the surrounding four regional municipalities. Census data from 2006 has shown there are 3,707 census farms in the GTA, down 4.2% from 2001 and covering . Almost every community in the GTA is currently experiencing a decrease in the acreage of farmland, with Mississauga seeing the most significant. The only communities in the GTA that are experiencing a growth in the acreage of farmland are Aurora, Georgina, Newmarket, Oshawa, Richmond Hill and Scugog, with Markham experiencing neither any growth nor decline. Most of the GTA's farmland is in Durham Region, with 55% of their total land area being farmland. This is followed by York Region with 41% of their lands being farmland, Peel Region with 34%, and Halton Region with 41%. Toronto's remaining farmland is completely within Rouge Park in the Rouge Valley. The average size of the farm in the GTA is much lower than the farms in the rest of Ontario (averaging ). This has been attributed to the shift of farm types in the GTA from the traditional livestock and cash crop farms (requiring an extensive land base), towards more intensive enterprises including greenhouse, floriculture, nursery, vegetable, fruit, sheep and goats.

The most numerous farm types in the GTA are miscellaneous specialty farms (including horse and pony, sheep and lamb, and other livestock specialty), followed by cattle, grain and oilseed, dairy and field crop farms. Although the output of dairy production has dropped with farms from within the GTA, dairy has remained the most productive sector in the agricultural industry by annual gross farm receipts. Despite the decreased amount of farmland around the region, farm capital value increased from $5.2 billion in 1996 to $6.1 billion in 2001, making the average farm capital value in the GTA continued to be the highest in the province.

Infrastructure

Transportation

There are a number of public transportation operators within the Greater Toronto Area, providing services within their jurisdictions. While these operators are largely independent, provisions are being made to integrate them under Metrolinx, which manages transportation planning including public transport in the Greater Toronto and Hamilton Area. GO Transit, which merged with Metrolinx during the late 2000s, is Ontario's only intra-regional public transit service, linking the communities in the GTA and the city of Hamilton, as well as the rest of the Greater Golden Horseshoe. Implementation of a 'Presto card' by Metrolinx has created a common means for all fare payments and allows for seamless connection between these and other transit operators.

Public transit operators in the GTA include Brampton Transit, Burlington Transit, Durham Region Transit, GO Transit, Milton Transit, MiWay (serving Mississauga), Oakville Transit, Toronto Transit Commission (TTC), and York Region Transit. The TTC operates the Toronto subway system, which runs in Toronto and in Vaughan, the latter of which began to be served by the system in December 2017 with an extension of Line 1 to Vaughan Metropolitan Centre station on Highway 7 at Jane Street.

The GTA also consists of a number of King's Highways and supplemented by municipal expressways. One of the principal highways in the GTA, Highway 401, is also the longest in Ontario and is also one of the busiest highways in the world. Notably, a segment of the highway passing through the GTA is North America's busiest highway. The GTA is laced with a number of limited-access highways including the 400-series highways. These include:

Note: "York", "Peel", "Durham" and "Halton" here refer to the regional municipalities.

  Highway 400 – York, Toronto
  Highway 401 – Durham, Toronto, Peel, Halton
  Highway 403 – Peel, Halton
  Highway 404 – York, Toronto
  /  407 ETR / Highway 407 – Durham, Peel, York, Halton (toll route)
  Highway 409 – Toronto, Peel
  Highway 410 – Peel
  Highway 412 – Durham
  Highway 418 – Durham
  Highway 427 – York, Toronto, Peel
  Queen Elizabeth Way – Peel, Halton, Toronto
  Gardiner Expressway – Toronto
  Don Valley Parkway – Toronto
  William R. Allen Road – Toronto

The main airport serving the GTA is Toronto Pearson International Airport in Mississauga, which is Canada's largest and busiest airport. It processed over 47 million passengers in 2017 and nearly 50 million passengers in 2018. Toronto Pearson International Airport is operated by the Greater Toronto Airports Authority (GTAA). John C. Munro Hamilton International Airport in nearby Hamilton also handles international flights handles some discount flights and charters and acts as an alternative to Pearson. The Billy Bishop Toronto City Airport on the Toronto Islands near downtown is used for civil aviation, air ambulance traffic and regional scheduled airlines (it handled nearly two million passengers in 2012). There are also a number of smaller airports scattered throughout the GTA. The International Air Transport Association (IATA) uses YTO as a code for multiple airports in the area, including those without passenger service.

The Greater Toronto Airport Authority has also placed a tentative proposal to develop a new airport in Pickering (which also extends over into Markham and Uxbridge). As the GTAA predicts Toronto Pearson would be unable to be the sole provider for the bulk of Toronto's commercial air traffic in the next 20 years from the report's publication in 2004 (i.e. in 2024), they believe a new airport in Pickering would address the need for a regional/reliever airport east of Toronto Pearson, as well as complement the airport in Hamilton, Ontario. The GTAA also stated the new airport would create more opportunities for economic development in the eastern region of the Greater Toronto Area.

The region also has significant maritime infrastructure being on the Great Lakes-St. Lawrence Seaway system. The Port of Oshawa and Port of Toronto handle between 2 and 4 million tonnes of cargo annually. The Port of Toronto also has an International Marine Passenger Terminal, which had 12,000 cruise passengers in 2019.

Communication
The Greater Toronto Area is served by seven distinct telephone area codes. Before 1993, the GTA used the 416 area code. In a 1993 zone split, Metropolitan Toronto retained the 416 code, while the other municipalities of the Greater Toronto Area were assigned the new area code 905. This division by area code has become part of the local culture to the point where local media refer to something inside Toronto as "the 416" and outside of Toronto as "the 905". For example, the Raptors 905 basketball team in the NBA G League is named after the area code the team represents. Though for the most part, the use of the area 905 as shorthand for the suburban areas outside Toronto city limits was correct, it is not entirely true as some portions of Durham and York Regions use the 705 area code. Furthermore, there are areas, such as Hamilton, the Regional Municipality of Niagara and Port Hope (in Northumberland County) that use the 905 area code, but are not part of the GTA. The unincorporated community of Acton (in Halton Hills), is the only community in the GTA that uses the 519 area code, which covers most of Southwestern Ontario.

To meet the increased demand for phone numbers, two overlay area codes were introduced in 2001. Area code 647 (supplementing the 416 area code) was introduced in March 2001 and area code 289 (supplementing the 905 area code) was introduced in July 2001. Some individuals within the 905 area code region may have to dial long distance to reach each other; although residents of Mississauga and Hamilton share the same area code (905), an individual from Toronto, for example, would have to dial "1" to reach Hamilton, but not to reach Mississauga. Ten-digit telephone dialling, including the area code for local calls, is required throughout the GTA. In March 2013, two additional area codes were introduced to the GTA: area code 437 in Toronto and area code 365 in the area served by 905 and 289.

Government
Since the 2015 election, the Greater Toronto Area has been represented by 58 Members of Parliament in the House of Commons of Canada. Forty-six Members of the Provincial Parliament also represent the GTA in the Ontario Legislature. Five Senators from Ontario have also designated themselves as representatives of certain areas in the GTA in the Canadian Senate.

Federal politics

Federally, the Conservatives, Liberals, and the New Democrats (NDP) all hold several electoral districts in the GTA. The City of Toronto has often been supportive of the Liberal Party. Traditionally, Liberal support is strongest in Downtown Toronto, while Conservative support is stronger in the surrounding communities outside Toronto. The NDP also has a strong base within the GTA. The Greater Toronto Area has the ability to influence election results and determine the governing party in Canada, due in part to its large population and riding count.

From 1993 to 2011, a centre-right party failed to win a single seat in the former Metro Toronto. In the 2011 election, however, a surge in NDP support combined with a collapse in Liberal support allowed the Conservatives to win eight seats in Toronto itself, and another 24 in the suburbs. Toronto's political leanings now appeared to mirror those of surrounding communities that leaned toward the Conservatives.

The election of 2011 showed Liberal support, based on votes in the GTA, had collapsed from 43.7% to 30.6%, giving the Liberals only 14.9% of the local seats in the House of Commons. However, the support of the Conservatives and NDP increased accordingly, with the Conservatives increasing their vote share from 31.5% to 42.2% (and capturing 68.1% of the GTA seats) and the NDP increasing from 14.6% to 23.2% of the vote and 17% of the local Federal ridings.

In the 2015 federal election, the Liberals regained their dominance of the GTA after suffering devastating losses there four years earlier. They defeated a number of prominent incumbents from both the NDP and the Conservatives. The Liberals took all of Toronto itself. They also took back almost all of the suburban ridings they had lost in 2011. Both the NDP and the Conservatives suffered heavily as their support collapsed in the inner city and the suburbs respectively. Only a few Conservatives held onto their seats in the outer ring of the GTA, while the NDP failed to elect any MPs in this area. The 2019 and 2021 federal elections have similar results.

Provincial politics

Toronto is the capital of Ontario with the Ontario Legislative Building, often metonymically known as Queen's Park after the street and park surrounding it, being located in downtown Toronto. Most of the provincial government offices are also located in downtown Toronto.

On the provincial level of government, the Ontario Progressive Conservatives, Ontario Liberals, and the Ontario New Democrats all hold electoral districts in the GTA. While the GTA provided a strong base of support for the Progressive Conservative government between 1995 and 2003, the Ontario Liberal Party achieved a major victory in the GTA during the 2003 election and has enjoyed strong support from the region ever since. In the 2011 election, the Liberals won 33 of the 44 available seats in the GTA, allowing Premier Dalton McGuinty to hold onto a minority government. The 2014 election under McGuinty's successor, Kathleen Wynne, was an even bigger electoral landslide for the Liberals, as they won 38 seats in the region. They even took a number of ridings in territory that had voted PC for decades, like Durham, Burlington, Newmarket-Aurora and Halton. The PCs hold no seats in Peel Region, and only one seat in each of the Halton, York, and Durham regions. While the NDP has been weak in the GTA since the 1995 election, they have seen some successes in Brampton and Durham Region, where they hold one seat each.

The Progressive Conservative Party of Ontario has not won a riding in the city of Toronto during a general election from 1999 to 2018. On the other end of the spectrum, the NDP saw major losses in Toronto during the 2014 election, and only hold two seats in the city. This is no longer the case since the 2018 provincial election, as the Progressive Conservatives and the NDP made significant gains at the expense of the Liberals and this continues to hold true in the 2022 provincial election.

Municipal politics

In 2011, 244 politicians govern the Greater Toronto Area below the provincial and federal levels, holding offices in cities, towns, and regional municipalities. Unusual for a large North American urban agglomeration, the GTA has very few agencies with powers that can cross boundaries.
Attempts to create an interregional organization have been made, such as the Province of Ontario's Office of the Greater Toronto Area (OGTA) in 1988 and the Greater Toronto Services Board (GTSB) in 1998, but have failed due to a lack of real authority in these agencies.

Consequently, there are few interregional public authorities: Metrolinx, an agency of the provincial government, manages the GTA-wide GO Transit system, while the Toronto and Region Conservation Authority manages some of the GTA's watersheds and natural areas. Notably, there is no organization with broad powers as in other Canadian cities, such as the Communauté métropolitaine de Montréal and Metro Vancouver Regional District.

Demographics

According to the latest census data from 2021 from Statistics Canada, the population of this area is 6,712,341. Population growth studies have projected the City of Toronto's population in 2031 to be 3,000,000 and the Greater Toronto Area's population to be 7,450,000, while the Ontario Ministry of Finance states it could reach 7.7 million by 2025. Statistics Canada identified in 2001 that four major urban regions in Canada exhibited a cluster pattern of concentrated population growth among which included the Greater Golden Horseshoe Census Region, which includes all of the Greater Toronto Area (which includes Oshawa), as well as other Southern Ontario cities including Niagara, Hamilton, Guelph, Kitchener-Cambridge-Waterloo and Barrie. Combined, the Greater Golden Horseshoe has a population of 9,765,188 in 2021, containing over 20% of Canada's population.

The Toronto CMA also has the largest proportions of foreign-born residents (46%) as a share of the total population out of all metropolitan areas in the Organization for Economic Co-operation and Development (OECD). The Toronto region is also unusually diverse over the composition of its ethnicities. The four largest foreign-born populations of Toronto only constitute 15% of the total foreign-born population. This is opposed to the four largest foreign-born populations of other metropolitan areas such as New York and London, where they make up 25% of their respective foreign-born populations.

Statistics Canada also found in 2006, there were 31,910 Indigenous people living in the Greater Toronto Area, which represented 2.7% of all Indigenous peoples in Canada and 13.2% of those in Ontario. The majority of which, however, are not registered with the Indian reserves within the Greater Toronto Area, the Chippewas of Georgina Island First Nation and the Mississaugas of Scugog Island First Nation.

Education
Education in the Greater Toronto Area is managed by the provincial Ministry of Education, who manages preschool, elementary and secondary education, while the provincial Ministry of Colleges and Universities administers laws relating to tertiary education, including colleges, universities, and vocational schools.

Primary and secondary education
There are presently twelve public English first language school boards, and two French first language school boards operating within the GTA. Seven of these school boards operate secular schools, whereas the other seven operate separate schools; the seven separate school boards in the Greater Toronto Area all serve the Roman Catholic faith. In addition to public schools, there are also a number of private schools that operate within Greater Toronto.

Three of these GTA-based public school boards also manage institutions outside Greater Toronto, the two French first language school boards, based in Toronto, as well as the Dufferin-Peel Catholic District School Board (DPCDSB). Conversely, English first language public schools in Clarington, a municipality within Durham Region, are managed by school boards based outside the GTA.

Post-secondary education

Colleges
The Greater Toronto Area is also home to six publicly funded colleges that have campuses spread in and around the metropolitan area. The six publicly funded colleges based in the Greater Toronto include:

 Centennial College (Toronto, Pickering)
 Durham College (Pickering, Brock, Scugog, Oshawa, Uxbridge)
 George Brown College (Toronto)
 Humber College (Toronto)
 Seneca College (King, Markham, Newmarket, Toronto, Vaughan)
 Sheridan College (Brampton, Mississauga, Oakville)

Another publicly funded college, Collège Boréal, also maintains a satellite campus in Toronto. However, Collège Boréal's main campus, and administration, is based outside the GTA, in Greater Sudbury. In addition to publicly funded colleges, there are also a number of private career colleges spread throughout the Greater Toronto Area.

Universities

The Greater Toronto Area is home to six publicly funded universities. Universities based within Greater Toronto include:

 OCAD University (Toronto)
 Ontario Tech University (Oshawa)
 Toronto Metropolitan University (Toronto, formerly Ryerson University)
 Université de l'Ontario français (Toronto)
 University of Toronto (Toronto, Mississauga)
 York University (Toronto)

Three publicly funded universities based outside of the GTA operate satellite campuses within the GTA, including the Hamilton-based McMaster University, Peterborough-based Trent University, and the Guelph-based University of Guelph. The McMaster's DeGroote School of Business operates the Ron Joyce Centre in Burlington; Trent University operates a satellite campus in Oshawa, referred to as Trent in Oshawa; The University of Guelph operates an affiliated institution alongside Humber College, the University of Guelph-Humber, in Toronto.

There also are eleven private religious universities spread throughout the GTA.

See also

 Greater Toronto Hockey League
 Environmental issues in Toronto
 Toronto Region Research Alliance

Notes

Footnotes

References

External links

 

 
Metropolitan areas of Ontario